Ridgewood Park is a neighborhood in east Dallas Texas (USA).  It is bordered by Lovers Lane on the north, Abrams Road on the west, the DART  on the south, and Fisher Road on the east.

The city of Dallas' Ridgewood/Belcher Recreation Center is located in the southeastern portion of the neighborhood.

References

External links
 Ridgewood Park